Elephants and Grass is a 2001 Turkish drama film, written and directed by Derviş Zaim, about six different stories that merge into a common theme.

Cast
Ali Sürmeli as Camoka 
Sanem Çelik as Marathon runner Havva Adem 
Bülent Kayabaş as Minister Aziz Bebek 
Haluk Bilginer as Sabit Üzücü 
Uğur Polat as Şeref 
Semir Aslanyürek as  Russian Mob 
Ezel Akay as  CIA Agent

External links 

2001 drama films
2001 films
Films set in Turkey
Films shot in Turkey
Films directed by Derviş Zaim
Golden Orange Behlül Dal Jury Special Award winners
Turkish drama films